Wockhardt Hospitals Ltd is a tertiary care, super speciality healthcare network in India offering healthcare services. The chain of hospitals is owned by the promoters of Wockhardt, a global pharmaceutical company. It has six hospitals across four western Indian cities–Mumbai, Nagpur, Nashik and Rajkot.

History
Wockhardt Hospitals started its first operations with a medical center in Kolkata in 1989 and a heart hospital in Bangalore two years later. The company was incorporated on 28 August 1991 under the Companies Act, 1956 as a public limited company, originally named First Hospitals and Heart Institute Limited. Wockhardt Hospitals were one of the early movers among corporate health-care chains in India.

On 11 September 2000, the name was changed to Wockhardt Health Sciences Limited and subsequently on 19 October 2000 the name was changed to Wockhardt Hospitals Limited.

In 2009, Wockhardt Hospitals sold 10 of its hospitals in Mumbai, Bangalore and Kolkata to Fortis Healthcare for 909 crore, which left it with seven multi speciality hospitals in Western India.

Timeline
January 1990 Wockhardt Medical Centre, Kolkata
March 1991 Wockhardt Hospital and Heart Institute, Bangalore
July 1993 Wockhardt Hospital and Kidney Institute, Kolkata
July 2002 Wockhardt Hospital, Mulund, Mumbai
July 2004 Wockhardt Heart Hospital, Nagpur
July 2005 Kamineni Wockhardt Hospital, Hyderabad
January 2006 Wockhardt Hospital, Bannerghatta Road, Bangalore
February 2006 Wockhardt Heart Centre, Hyderabad
January 2007 N M Virani Wockhardt Hospital, Rajkot
January 2007 Wockhardt Hospital, Chord Road, Bangalore
April 2007 Sterling Wockhardt Hospital, Navi Mumbai
June 2007 Wockhardt Hospital, Chord Road, Bangalore
2010 NUSI Wockhardt Hospitals, Goa
2014 Acquisition of Management and Operation of TUIMSAR, North Mumbai
November 2014 New Age Wockhardt Hospitals, South Mumbai

Associations
Wockhardt-HMI HIV/AIDS Education and Research Foundation (WHARF) is a non-government organization established to provide training to healthcare professionals and counselors in India.

References

Hospital networks in India
Hospitals in India
1989 establishments in Maharashtra
Companies based in Mumbai
Hospitals in Mumbai
Indian companies established in 1989